Jacob Bowman Sweitzer (July 4, 1821 – November 7, 1888) was a Pennsylvania lawyer and soldier who commanded a regiment and then a brigade in the Army of the Potomac in the American Civil War. He and his men were significantly engaged at the 1863 Battle of Gettysburg, where they reinforced and helped temporarily stabilize the Union defensive line on the second day of fighting.

Early life
Jacob Bowman Sweitzer was born July 4, 1821, in Brownsville, Fayette County, Pennsylvania. He was the son of Henry Sweitzer 1780-1852, and Ann Elliott Bowman 1790-1876. His Paternal ancestors were George Ludwig "Lewis" Sweitzer 1740-1795, and Conrad Sweitzer/Schweitzer 1706-1770, who arrived in Philadelphia in 1749, from Germany. His brother, Nelson Bowman Sweitzer, who became a career army officer, was born in Brownsville seven years later.  Jacob Sweitzer studied at Jefferson College, graduating in 1843.

He later studied law, passed the bar exam, and established a legal practice.

Civil War
Sweitzer was named major of the 62nd Pennsylvania Infantry on July 4, 1861.  He became lieutenant colonel on November 17 of that year and colonel on June 27, 1862.  Sweitzer served in the Seven Days Battles, being wounded and captured at the Battle of Gaines's Mill.  After being exchanged on August 15, 1862, he led his regiment in the First Division, V Corps at the Second Battle of Bull Run and at Antietam in the brigade of Brig. Gen. Charles Griffin.

When Griffin became commander of the First Division, Sweitzer was temporarily his successor in brigade command, including at the Battle of Fredericksburg. Subsequently, Sweitzer returned to his regimental role.  He resumed command of the brigade at the Battle of Chancellorsville, succeeding Col. James McQuade.  (McQuade was senior to Sweitzer, but he had missed Fredericksburg.)

Gettysburg
At the Battle of Gettysburg, the V Corps arrived early on July 2, 1863, after a hard march from Unionville, Maryland.  The First Division, temporarily led by Brig. Gen. James Barnes, was sent to the left flank to aid III Corps. Sweitzer’s brigade and that of Col. William S. Tilton went into action between the Wheatfield and the Peach Orchard.  (The Third Brigade, under Col. Strong Vincent was detached and sent to Little Round Top.) The two brigades were deployed at a perpendicular angle to one another, which made their position hard to maintain under attack.  After enduring Confederate assaults, General Barnes decided to withdraw from an exposed position.  Sweitzer’s report describes the order to withdraw as "peremptory".

Sweitzer’s command, however, was sent back into the fight, entering the Wheatfield. It was flanked, however, by Confederate Brig. Gen. William T. Wofford's brigade, suffering serious losses.  Col. Harrison Jeffords of the 4th Michigan Infantry was killed when Confederate soldiers tried to capture his regiment’s flag.  The brigade withdrew toward Little Round Top and was positioned in that vicinity for the remainder of the battle.  It later participated in the retreat of the Confederate army.  Sweitzer had only three regiments present (the 9th Massachusetts Regiment was on detached duty).  He reported that his regiments lost 466 out of 1,010 present on the field.

Sweitzer retained his brigade in the autumn of 1863, participating in the earlier stages of Bristoe Campaign and in the Mine Run Campaign.

After Gettysburg
When the Army of the Potomac was reorganized preceding Lt. Gen. Ulysses S. Grant's Overland Campaign, Sweitzer retained brigade command in Griffin’s First Division.  His brigade absorbed Tilton’s 22nd Regiment Massachusetts Volunteer Infantry.  Sweitzer led the brigade at the Battle of the Wilderness and the Battle of Spotsylvania.  Sweitzer distinguished himself at the Battle of North Anna, holding the exposed right flank of V Corps during a Confederate attack near Jericho Mills. He also commanded these troops at the Battle of Cold Harbor and the early stages of the Siege of Petersburg.

Sweitzer was mustered out with his regiment on July 13, 1864.  He received a brevet promotion to the rank of brigadier general for "war service" on March 13, 1865.

Postbellum activities
After leaving the army, Sweitzer settled in Pittsburgh, Pennsylvania.  He resumed legal practice in Pittsburgh.  Sweitzer died on November 7, 1888, and was buried at Allegheny Cemetery.

See also

References
 Eicher, John H., and Eicher, David J., Civil War High Commands, Stanford University Press, 2001, .
 Pfanz, Harry W., Gettysburg: The Second Day, Chapel Hill: University of North Carolina Press, 1987.
 Rhea, Gordon C., To the North Anna River: Grant and Lee, May 13–25, 1864, Baton Rouge: Louisiana State University Press, 2000.

Notes

Union Army colonels
People of Pennsylvania in the American Civil War
People from Brownsville, Pennsylvania
Lawyers from Pittsburgh
Pennsylvania lawyers
Washington & Jefferson College alumni
1821 births
1888 deaths
Burials at Allegheny Cemetery
19th-century American lawyers